"Run With Me" is a pop rock song performed by German singer Jeanette. The song was written by Johan Bobäck, Christian Fast, Marica Lindé and Mans Ek and produced by Bobäck for Jeanette's sixth album Naked Truth (2006). It was released as a single on 8 November 2004 in Germany.

Music video 
The music video for "Run With Me" was directed by Jörn Heitmann. The video features Jeanette performing with her band on an elaborate set. It begins with Jeanette and her band performing on a raised set. She is then shown observing an unhappy young couple in black-and-white. As she smiles at them, colour begins to appear on the screen and the couple happily stand up and hold hands. This is followed by Jeanette encouraging a young man to complete his studies. The music video concludes with a group of people running with Jeanette

Formats and track listings 
These are the formats and track listings of major single releases of "Run With Me".

CD single
(0602498688793; Released )
 "Run With Me" (Rock radio edit) – 3:35
 "Run With Me" (Pop radio edit) – 3:37
 "Rock A Fella" – 2:40
 "Run With Me" (Karaoke version) – 3:31
 "Run With Me" (Dance edit) – 3:16
 "Run With Me" music video

Digital download
(Released )
 "Run With Me" (Rock radio edit) – 3:35
 "Run With Me" (Pop radio edit) – 3:37
 "Rock A Fella" – 2:40
 "Run With Me" (Karaoke version) – 3:31
 "Run With Me" (Dance edit) – 3:16

Charts

References

External links 
 Official website

2004 singles
Jeanette Biedermann songs
Songs written by Johan Bobäck
2004 songs
Universal Music Group singles